Project Cost Management (PCM) is a method that uses technology to measure cost and productivity through the full life-cycle of enterprise level projects.

PCM encompasses several specific functions of project management including estimating, job controls, field data collection, scheduling, accounting and design. PCM's main goal is to complete a project within an approved budget.

Beginning with estimating, a vital tool in PCM, actual historical data is used to accurately plan all aspects of the project. As the project continues, job control uses data from the estimate with the information reported from the field to measure the cost and production in the project. From project initiation to completion, project cost management has an objective to simplify and cheapen the project experience.

This technological approach has been a big challenger to the mainstream estimating software and project management industries.

This method is crucial for engineering in the buyer market trend: the market price is always fixed and to have competition.

Early Purchasing Involvement philosophy may be one of the solutions in future.

References